Inglis is an unincorporated community in Columbia County, Oregon, United States. Inglis post office was established on September 30, 1902, and was named after the first postmaster, John E. Inglis. The post office closed in 1910, then reopened in 1914, finally closing in 1918. The railroad station at this locale was named Inglis Station.

References

Unincorporated communities in Columbia County, Oregon
1902 establishments in Oregon
Populated places established in 1902
Unincorporated communities in Oregon